Oconee County High School is a public secondary school in Watkinsville, Georgia, United States. It is a public high school that hosts grades 9–12. It is one of two high schools in the Oconee County Public Schools district. Its mascot is the Warrior, and its colors are blue and white.

The school was ranked number 499 out of 500 in Newsweeks 2014 rankings of the top 500 high schools in America, and is consistently named one of the top public high schools in Georgia with regard to Scholastic Aptitude Test (SAT) scores.

OCHS offers football, wrestling, soccer, swimming and diving, volleyball, baseball, tennis, track, and cross country.  It also has a variety of fine arts programs, including a chorus, show choir, band, and drama program that produces musicals and one-act plays each year.

Notable alumni
Adam Frazier, MLB outfielder 
Zach Mettenberger, NFL Quarterback
Tony Taylor, NFL Linebacker
Jarryd Wallace, Paralympic bronze metalist

References

External links
 Oconee County School System
 Oconee County High School

Public high schools in Georgia (U.S. state)
Schools in Oconee County, Georgia